The 2018–19 Bonaire League, or known locally as the 2018–19 Kampionato, was the 49th season of the Bonaire League, the top division football competition in Bonaire. The season began on 2 November 2018 and ended on 17 May 2019. Real Rincon won their 11th title and were automatically qualified for the 2020 Caribbean Club Shield.

League table

References

Bonaire League seasons
2018–19 in Caribbean football leagues
1